Daniel Edward Conway (October 18, 1911 – April 13, 1987) was an American labor union leader.

Born in East St Louis, Illinois, he moved to Los Angeles, where he began working as a baker. He joined the Bakery and Confectionery Workers' International Union (BCWIU), and in 1937 he became business agent of its Local 37. He steadily rose through the union, becoming vice president in 1948, director of organization in 1953, and then administrative director in 1955.

In 1957, the union was expelled from the AFL–CIO, on charges of corruption. Conway sided with the AFL–CIO, and helped form a new union, the American Bakery and Confectionery Workers' International Union, of which he became president. In 1969, the union merged into the BCWIU, and Conway became its president. The following year, he was additionally elected as president of the International Union of Food, Agricultural, Hotel, Restaurant, Tobacco and Allied Workers' Associations (IUF), serving until 1977. He retired from the BCWIU in 1978. In 1983, his wife, Kay, died, and he relocated to Carlsbad, California.

References

1911 births
1987 deaths
American trade union leaders
People from East St. Louis, Illinois